The Type 928 assault boat is a class of fast Chinese assault boats.

History
In response to the Chinese deployment of the Type 0928D on Pangong Tso the Indian Navy upgraded the caliber of assault boat they were using on Pangong Tso.

Variants

Type 928B
Basic model, deployed to Pangong Tso before C and D. It is ice resistant.

Type 928C
The Type 0928C is a patrol boat rather than an assault boat. It is built by Changzhou FRP Shipyard Co Ltd. in Changzhou, Jiangsu, China.

Specifications
 Length: 13.20m 
 Beam: 3.24m 
 Draft 1.30m 
 Speed: 33.3kn 
 PAX: 23  
 Navigation area: Inland River Class A  
 Propulsion: 2 x 440hp  
 Armament: 1 x crew-served machine gun

Type 928 YC
Export model of the Type 928C, six delivered to Bolivia in 2019.

Type 928D
The Type 0928D is a modern assault boat generally modeled on the Swedish CB90-class fast assault craft. The Type 0928D is also built by Changzhou FRP Shipyard Co.

Specifications
 Length: 13.00m 
 Beam: 3.8m 
 Draft 1.80m
 Speed: 38.9kn 
 PAX: 11
 Navigation area: Inland River Class A
 Propulsion: 3 x 295hp
 Armament: 1 x remote weapon station with 12.7mm machine gun and 2 x pedestals for crew-served machine guns

Operators
 - Six Type 0928YC in service
 Type 098C is in service with PLAGF.

See also
 Mark V Special Operations Craft
 Multipurpose Assault Craft
 Jehu-class landing craft
 Centaur-class fast assault craft

References

External links
Forbes
Histton

Military equipment of the People's Republic of China
Military boats
Landing craft